Karl Wilhelm Julius Hugo Riemann (18 July 1849 – 10 July 1919) was a German musicologist and composer who was among the founders of modern musicology. The leading European music scholar of his time, he was active and influential as both a music theorist and music historian. Many of his contributions are now termed as Riemannian theory, a variety of related ideas on many aspects of music theory.

Biography
Riemann was born at Grossmehlra, Schwarzburg-Sondershausen.

His first musical training came from his father Robert Riemann, a land owner, bailiff and, to judge from locally surviving listings of his songs and choral works, an active music enthusiast.   Hugo Riemann was educated by  Heinrich Frankenberger, the Sondershausen Choir Master, in Music theory.  He was taught the piano by August Barthel and Theodor Ratzenberger (who had once studied under Liszt).

He studied law, and finally philosophy and history at Berlin and Tübingen. After participating in the Franco-Prussian War he decided to devote his life to music, and studied accordingly at the Leipzig Conservatory. He then went to Bielefeld for some years as a teacher and conductor, but in 1878 returned to Leipzig as a visiting professor ("Privatdozent") at the University.

As a much-desired appointment at the Conservatory did not materialize, Riemann went to Bromberg in 1880, but 1881–90 he was a teacher of piano and theory at Hamburg Conservatory. After a short time at the Sondershausen Conservatory, he held a post in the conservatory at Wiesbaden (1890–95).  He eventually returned to Leipzig University as lecturer in 1895. In 1901, he was appointed professor, and in 1914 he was made Director of the Institute of Musicology.

Eight days before he would have turned 70, he died of jaundice.

Writings
Riemann is one of the most influential music theorists. In his publications and lectures he coined various terms which are still in every day use, such as the harmonic function theory (therein popular terms such as the tonic, the dominant, the subdominant and the parallel). In addition, the term and theory of the metric and rhythmic phrase, a basic element of today's music education, originate in Riemann.

Among his best-known works are the Musik-Lexikon (1882; 5th ed. 1899; Eng. trans., 1893–96), a complete dictionary of music and musicians, the Geschichte der musiktheorie im IX.-XIX. jahrhundert(1898), a history of music theory in Europe through the 19th century, the Handbuch der Harmonielehre, a work on the study of harmony, and the Lehrbuch des Contrapunkts, a similar work on counterpoint, all of which have been translated into English. He was an advocate of harmonic dualism, and his theory of harmonic function is the foundation of harmonic theory as it is still taught in Germany. He also elaborated a set of harmonic transformations that was adapted by the American theorist David Lewin, and eventually evolved into a significant strain of neo-Riemannian theory. Another pillar of modern neo-Riemannian theory, the Tonnetz, was not Riemann's own invention, but he played an important role in popularizing and disseminating it.

He authored many works on many different branches of music. His pupils included the German composer, pianist, organist, and conductor Max Reger and the musicologist and composer Walter Niemann.

Compositions
He wrote many pieces for piano, songs, a piano sonata, six sonatinas, a violin sonata, and a string quartet.

See also 
 Riemannian theory
 Neo-Riemannian theory
 Chordal space
 Modulatory space
 Functional harmony
 Parallel and counter parallel

Notes

References
 
 Alexander Rehding: Hugo Riemann and the birth of modern musical thought. Cambridge: Cambridge University Press, 2003. 
 
 Edward Gollin and Alexander Rehding, The Oxford Handbook of Neo-Riemannian Music Theories. Oxford University Press, 2011.
 Daniel Harrison, Harmonic Function in Chromatic Music. University of Chicago Press, 1994.

External links

1849 births
1919 deaths
German composers
German music theorists
German musicologists
Academic staff of Leipzig University
People from Unstrut-Hainich-Kreis
People from Schwarzburg-Sondershausen